Live Oak Plantation may refer to:

 Live Oak Plantation, Florida, Leon County
 Live Oak Racing or Live Oak Plantation, racing name for Live Oak Stud in Ocala, Florida, breeder of horses such as World Approval